A number of steamships have been named Leopoldville or Léopoldville:
, 3,386 GRT, built by Sir Raylton Dixon & Co, Middlesbrough for the Compagnie Belge Maritime du Congo. Sold in 1897.
, 3,963 GRT, built by Sir Raylton Dixon & Co, Middlesbrough for the Compagnie Belge Maritime du Congo. Sold in 1901.
, 4,376 GRT, built by Sir Raylton Dixon & Co, Middlesbrough for the Compagnie Belge Maritime du Congo. Sold in 1908.
, 6,327 GRT, built by Harland & Wolff, Belfast for the Compagnie Belge Maritime du Congo. Sold in 1914.
, 11,509 GRT, built by J Cockerill SA, Hoboken, Antwerp for Compagnie Belge Maritime du Congo. Torpedoed and sunk in 1944.
, 10, 530 GRT, built by J Cockerill SA, Hoboken, Antwerp. Launched in 1948 and in service until 1967.
 

History of Kinshasa
Ship names